Gabriel Marie Étienne Vanel (12 January 1925 – 1 March 2013) was the Roman Catholic archbishop of the Archdiocese of Auch, France.

Ordained to the priesthood in 1949, Vanel was named bishop in 1970 and resigned in 1996.

Notes

1925 births
2013 deaths
People from Rhône (department)
Archbishops of Auch